The Rebound  (originally titled The Rebound: A Wheelchair Basketball Story) is a 2016 documentary sports film directed by Shaina Koren Allen, starring adaptive athletes Mario Moran, Jeremie "Phenom" Thomas, Orlando Carrillo and the Miami Heat Wheels wheelchair basketball team. Appearances from coaches, Paralympic athletes, and family shape the narrative along with cinéma vérité documentary coverage. The Rebound premiered at Miami International Film Festival in 2016, and has gone on to screen at 19 film festivals, including Cinequest, Napa Valley Film Festival, Dallas Film Festival, Brooklyn Film Festival, Naples International Film Festival, and more. The film has received awards including the Kaiser Permanente Thrive Award, Brooklyn Film Festival Audience Award for Best Documentary at Brooklyn Film Festival, Best Documentary Feature and Best Director - Documentary at Gallup Film Festival.

References

Documentary films about sportspeople with disability
2016 films
2016 documentary films
American sports documentary films
2010s American films
Films about disability